Senator Sanford may refer to:

Claudius Sanford (fl. 2000s–2010s), Opposition Senator in the House of Assembly of Dominica
Edward Sanford (New York politician) (1805–1876), New York State Senate
George H. Sanford (1836–1871), New York State Senate
John W. A. Sanford (1798–1870), Georgia State Senate
Mitchell Sanford (1799–1861), New York State Senate
Nathan Sanford (1777–1838), former United States Senator from New York
Nehemiah Curtis Sanford (1792–1841), Connecticut State Senate
Paul Sanford (fl. 2000s–2010s), Alabama State Senate
Reuben Sanford (1780–1855), New York State Senate
Richard K. Sanford (1822–1895), New York State Senate
Terry Sanford (1917–1998), former United States Senator from North Carolina